Carex pigra is a tussock-forming species of perennial sedge in the family Cyperaceae. It is native to south eastern parts of the United States.

See also
List of Carex species

References

pigra
Plants described in 1997
Flora of Florida
Flora of Louisiana
Flora of Alabama
Flora of Georgia (U.S. state)
Flora of Mississippi
Flora of Virginia
Flora of North Carolina
Flora of South Carolina
Flora of Tennessee